Sehnsucht (UK: Desire) is the fifth studio album by the electronic project Schiller undertaken by German musician, composer and producer Christopher Von Deylen. The album features collaboration with several established artists like Xavier Naidoo, Jaël, Kim Sanders, and Klaus Schulze among others.

The album was launched in four versions: a limited three-disc Super Deluxe Edition, a two-disc Deluxe Edition, a Standard Edition and a Double Vinyl Edition. The Super Deluxe edition contains 31 compositions from Christopher Von Deylen, mostly new. The DVD includes music videos, concert footage and a documentary. The two-disc Deluxe Edition contains selected songs from the Super Deluxe Edition and the DVD.

Track listing

Super Deluxe Edition
CD 01:

CD 02:

DVD:
 Denn wer liebt (with Anna Maria Mühe) (04:44)
 Herzschlag (Video) (04:43)
 Wunschtraum (04:33)
 Let Me Love You (Video) (05:07)
 Everything (04:01)
 Mitternacht (04:19)
 Sommernacht (04:40)
 In der weite (05:39)
 Wehmut (04:32)
 Forever (05:00)

BERLIN-CALCUTTA
 Zenit (with Klaus Schulze) (32:43)

INTERVIEW

PHOTOS

LIVE IN KIEW
 Schiller (06:15)
 I Saved You (05:35)
 Irrlicht (05:56)
 Nachtflug (06:53)

Deluxe edition
CD
 Willkommen (01:07)
 Wunschtraum (04:31)
 Let Me Love You (with Kim Sanders) (06:38)
 Denn Wer Liebt (with Anna Maria Mühe) (03:59)
 Sehnsucht (with Xavier Naidoo) (03:57)
 Wehmut (04:16)
 In The Dark (with Jette Von Roth) (05:00)
 Vor Der Zeit (with Ben Becker) (03:18)
 Tired (with Jaël) (04:45)
 Herzschlag (04:40)
 Porque Te Vas (with Ana Torroja) (04:27)
 Everything (with Helen Boulding) (04:00)
 Zenit | Ausschnitt (with Klaus Schulze) (03:57)
 In Der Weite (with Anna Maria Mühe) (05:11)
 Sommernacht (04:41)
 Destiny (with Despina Vandi & Phoebus) (04:13)
 Mitternacht (04:26)
 Fate (with Isis Gee) (04:25)

DVD
 Herzschlag (Video) (04:43)
 Wunschtraum (Video) (04:33)
 Let Me Love You (Video) (05:07)
 Everything (Video) (04:01)
 Sommernacht (Video) (04:40)
 In Der Weite (Video) (05:39)
 Wehmut (Video) (04:32)
 Forever (Video) (05:00)
 Berlin Calcutta | Teil 1, 2 & 3 (12:20)
 Zenit (with Klaus Schulze) (32:43)
 Schiller (Live in Kiew) (06:15)
 I Saved You (Live in Kiew) (05:35)

Standard edition
 Wilkommen
 Herzschlag
 Denn Wer Liebt (with Anna Maria Muehe)
 Sehnsucht (with Xavier Naidoo)
 Wehmut
 Black (with Jette von Roth)
 You (with Colbie Caillat)
 Let Me Love you (with Kim Sanders)
 Wunschtraum
 Time For Dreams (with Lang Lang)
 In Der Weite (with Anna Maria Muehe)
 Sommernacht
 Tired (with Jael)
 Vor Der Zeit (with Ben Becker)
 White
 Mitternacht
 Ile Aye (with Stephenie Coker)
 Zenit (with Klaus Schulze)
 Forever (with Kim Sanders)

Double vinyl edition
A1
 Willkommen (01:06)
 Wunschtraum (04:36)
 Let Me Love You (with Kim Sanders) (06:34)
 Denn Wer Liebt (with Anna Maria Mühe) (04:00)
 Sehnsucht (with Xavier Naidoo) (03:58)
 Wehmut (04:18)

B1
 In The Dark (with Jette Von Roth) (05:00)
 Vor Der Zeit (with Ben Becker) (03:19)
 Tired (with Jaël) (04:46)
 Herzschlag (04:41)
 Porque Te Vas (with Ana Torroja) (04:30)

A2
 Everything (with Helen Boulding) (04:01)
 Zenit | Ausschnitt (with Klaus Schulze) (08:24)
 In Der Weite (with Anna Maria Mühe) (05:15)
 Sommernacht (04:54)

B2
 Destiny (with Despina Vandi & Phoebus) (04:18)
 Heaven (with Bernstein) (Exclusive bonustrack) (03:54)
 Mitternacht (04:15)
 Tired of Being Alone (with Tarja Turunen) (04:09)
 Fate (with Isis Gee) (04:28)

Year-end charts

Certifications

References

External links
 Sehnsucht Microsite
 Official International Homepage  

2008 compilation albums
2008 video albums
Music video compilation albums
Live video albums
Documentary films about electronic music and musicians
2008 live albums
Island Records video albums
Island Records live albums
Island Records compilation albums
Schiller (band) albums